Francisco Giovanni León Rodríguez  (born 12 March 1992) is a former Mexican professional footballer who last played as a centre-back.

Career
In 2007, at age 16, he was signed by Primera División (First Division) club Atlas and soon joined their youth system. In 2009, he was called up to the Mexico U-17. After 4 years in Atlas youth system he was sent on loan to First Division Club Puebla on 9 June 2011.

He played with Atlético Veracruz of the Liga de Balompié Mexicano during the league's inaugural season, leading them to a runners-up finish after losing to Chapulineros de Oaxaca in the finals.

Career statistics

References

External links
 Player Under 17 call up
 
 

1992 births
Living people
Club Puebla players
Atlas F.C. footballers
Leones Negros UdeG footballers
Club Atlético Zacatepec players
Alebrijes de Oaxaca players
Murciélagos FC footballers
Atlético San Luis footballers
Liga MX players
Ascenso MX players
Footballers from Baja California
People from Ensenada, Baja California
Association football defenders
Mexican footballers
Liga Premier de México players
Tercera División de México players
Liga de Balompié Mexicano players